The Montreux Album is the fifth studio album by the English rock band Smokie, released in 1978. Recorded primarily at Mountain Studios in Montreux (hence the album's title) between 6 and 24 February 1978, it was the band's last album to be made in partnership with Nicky Chinn and Mike Chapman.

Track listing

Personnel
Credits are adapted from the album's 1978 and 2016 liner notes.
Smokie
Chris Norman – lead vocals, backing vocals, lead and rhythm guitars, keyboards, synthesizers
Alan Silson – lead vocals (on "You Took Me by Surprise), backing vocals, acoustic and electric lead guitars
Terry Uttley – lead vocals (on "Light Up My Life"), backing vocals, bass guitar
Pete Spencer – lead vocals (on "Petesey's Song"), backing vocals, drums and percussion, tenor sax (on "No More Letters")

Technical personnel
Mike Chapman – production
Pete Coleman – engineering
Ian Cooper – mixing (at Whitney Recording Studios, Glendale, California, in March 1978) and mastering (at Utopia Studios, London, England)
Richard Gray – sleeve design
Gered Mankowitz – art direction and photography

Remastering
Tim Turan at Turan Audio – 2007 remastering
MM Sound Digital Mastering Studios – 2016 remastering

Charts

Weekly charts

Year-end charts

Certifications

References
Notes
"For a Few Dollars More" was recorded in 24–26 August 1977 at Bovema Studios (Heemstede, Holland).

Citations

External links
Discography 1975-1982

Smokie (band) albums
1978 albums
Pop rock albums by English artists
Country rock albums by English artists
Rak Records albums
Albums produced by Mike Chapman